Jichuk Station is located just northwest of Seoul on Seoul Subway Line 3. It is within walking distance to Eunpyeong-gu, Seoul. Jichuk station has a subway depot for Line 3 trains nearby.

Origin of the name
Jichuk Station is named after the administrative area (dong) that it is located in. The area used to belong to two villages in the Joseon period. Jijeong-ri produced paper, while Chuk-ri was famous for its bush clover. When the area became united under Goyang-gun, it was named using the first syllables of the two villages.

Station layout

Passengers

References

Seoul Metropolitan Subway stations
Railway stations opened in 1990
Metro stations in Goyang
Seoul Subway Line 3